Molinier was the stage name of François Gély (1807–1859), a French operatic  baritone who mostly performed minor roles at the Paris Opéra.

He made his professional debut without much success on 15 February 1826 with the Opéra-Comique at the Salle Feydeau as Alibour in Méhul's Euphrosine et Coradin.

He first appeared at the Paris Opéra on 2 October 1837 as an emergency replacement in a leading bass role, Pietro in Daniel Auber's La muette de Portici. He sang with great emotion, but was thought to have overextended his resources. However, having rescued the performance (and the receipts), he was rewarded by engagement as a company regular, and continued to sing there until 1854. During this period he created a number of minor roles, as noted in the list below. He also performed other minor roles, such as a herald-in-arms in Meyerbeer's Robert le diable, the Comte de Nevers in Meyerbeer's Les Huguenots, Rodolphe and Melcthal in Rossini's Guillaume Tell, and Pharaon in Rossini's Moïse.

Roles created

 1838: Lorenzo in Guido et Ginevra by Halévy
 1838: Pompeo in Benvenuto Cellini by Berlioz
 1839: Pikler in Le lac des fées by Auber
 1840: A Christian in Les martyrs by Donizetti
 1840: A lord in La favorite by Donizetti
 1843: A student in Charles VI by Halévy
 1844: Randolph in Marie Stuart by Louis Niedermeyer
 1847: A herald in Jérusalem by Giuseppe Verdi
 1849: The herald in Le prophète by Meyerbeer
 1852: A lord in Le Juif errant by Halévy

References
Notes

Sources
 Parsons, Charles H. (1993). Opera Premieres: An Index of Casts/Performers: K–Z, Volume 16 in the series The Mellen Opera Index. Lewiston, New York: The Edward Mellen Press. .
 Tamvaco, Jean-Louis (2000). Les Cancans de l'Opéra. Chroniques de l'Académie Royale de Musique et du théâtre, à Paris sous les deux restorations (2 volumes, in French). Paris: CNRS Editions. .
 Wolff, Stéphane (1962). L'Opéra au Palais Garnier (1875–1962). Paris: Deposé au journal L'Entr'acte . Paris: Slatkine (1983 reprint) .

French operatic baritones
1807 births
1859 deaths
19th-century French male opera singers